Frank Donovan may refer to:

 Frank Donovan (footballer) (1919–2003), Welsh Olympic footballer
 Frank Donovan (politician) (born 1947), Australian politician

See also
Francis Donovan (disambiguation)
Frank O'Donovan, Irish actor and singer